Francine Lacqua (born 15 December 1978) is an Italian journalist, television anchor and editor-at-large for Bloomberg Television. She is fluent in English, Italian and French.

Early life

Lacqua was born in Italy, of Italian parents. While she was growing-up, her father, Pier Antonio Lacqua, a journalist working for the Italian news agency, Ansa, was posted in Russia, the United States and the United Kingdom. He covered the Cold War and was a political expert. As a result, she lived in Moscow from the age of 1 until the age of 6, in Washington, D.C., from the age of 6 to 15 and thereafter in London until she went to Paris for her studies in 1998.

Education
While living in Washington, she attended the Lycee Rochambeau. She later joined the Lycée Français Charles de Gaulle in London where she completed her Baccalauréat.  Following school, in 1996 she was accepted on the double-degree in English and French law at King's College London and Universite de Paris I, Pantheon-Sorbonne.  She graduated in 2000 with an LLB in English law and Maitrise en droit.

Career 
Lacqua joined Bloomberg as an intern in the summer of 2000, initially working for French television, based in London, UK.  Later that year she was offered a permanent position with French Television, working as a producer.  In 2001 she began to present news output in French.

In 2003 she moved to Bloomberg’s UK television output, where she began to appear as a reporter, covering OPEC meetings, meetings of the European Finance Ministers, G7, and World 
Economic Forum meetings (including their annual meeting in Davos, Switzerland). During this time she also carried out in depth interviews with Mark Mobius, George Soros, Christine Lagarde, Warren Buffett, and Jean-Claude Trichet.

In 2004 she was one of the last foreign journalists to interview the then Lebanese Prime Minister, Rafic Hariri. He was assassinated in the same spot where the interview took place a year later.

In 2008, she increasingly appeared as a news-anchor and, in 2010 began to present On the Move with Francine Lacqua until 2014, which was broadcast, to Europe, Asia and the United States.  In 2011 she conceived a new interview-show called Eye to Eye which involved her interviewing a well-known personality in a pod in the London Eye.  She interviewed, amongst others, Sir Philip Green, Margherita Missoni, Paul Smith, Christian Louboutin, Bianca Jagger and Sir Martin Sorrell.

In 2012, she presented City Central with Guy Johnson. Both anchors moved to The Pulse in 2013. Following Eye to Eye, Lacqua also hosted Leader's Lunch in 2013, which was replaced by Leaders with Lacqua shortly afterwards.

On 5 October 2015 Lacqua became co-anchor of Bloomberg Surveillance in London alongside Tom Keene in New York.

Awards
In 2012, she was part of the Bloomberg team that won the OPEC award for 'Public Interest Reporting'

In 2013, she was the winner of Television Personality of the Year awarded by the Association of International Broadcasters.

On 3 May 2018 Lacqua received the Knighthood of the Order of the Star of Italy (Cavaliere dell’Ordine della Stella d’Italia). The award was given and presented by Raffaele Trombetta, Italian Ambassador, on behalf of the president of Italy, at the Italian embassy in London.

Personal life 
Lacqua lives in London with her husband and two sons. Lacqua has a sister, Alessandra.

References

1978 births
Living people
Alumni of King's College London
Italian television personalities
Italian women journalists